Events from the year 1845 in Scotland.

Incumbents

Law officers 
 Lord Advocate – Duncan McNeill
 Solicitor General for Scotland – Adam Anderson

Judiciary 
 Lord President of the Court of Session and Lord Justice General – Lord Boyle
 Lord Justice Clerk – Lord Hope

Events 
 31 July – Aberdeen Railway Bill receives Royal Assent
 14 August – the Falkirk Herald newspaper is first published
 October – Aberdeen stock exchange formed
 Glasgow Academy founded
 Tolbooth Kirk, Edinburgh, designed by James Gillespie Graham and Augustus Pugin, is completed as a church and General Assembly hall (Victoria Hall) for the Church of Scotland in the Royal Mile
 Scottish Rights of Way Society established
 Publication of the New Statistical Account of Scotland is completed

Births 
 8 January – James Stedman Dixon, leading coal-mine owner (died 1911)
 14 February – Cecil Valentine De Vere, born Cecil Valentine Brown, chess player (died 1875)
 25 February – George Reid, Prime Minister of Australia, later Member of Parliament (UK) (died 1918)
 17 March – Robert Fleming, financier (died 1933)
 28 October – Robert Gibb, painter (died 1932)
 2 December – Alexander Crombie, surgeon (died 1906)
 David Forsyth, chess player (died 1909 in New Zealand)
 James Manson, locomotive engineer (died 1935)

Deaths 
 7 August – Robert Graham, physician and botanist (born 1786)
 30 September – Robert Forsyth, writer (born 1766)
 26 October – Carolina Nairne, songwriter (born 1766)

Sport 
 Penicuik hosts the inaugural Grand Match in curling, between the north and the south of Scotland.

See also 

 Timeline of Scottish history

References 

 
Scotland
1840s in Scotland